Harold Henry Joseph Allen (21 May 1890 – 20 January 1978) was an Australian rules footballer who played with Geelong in the Victorian Football League (VFL).

Notes

External links 

1890 births
1978 deaths
Australian rules footballers from Victoria (Australia)
Geelong Football Club players